Phyllis Jepkosgei Kipkingor Kandie, also Phyllis Jepkosgei Kandie, but commonly Phyllis Kandie (born c. 1965) is a Kenyan who was nominated by President Uhuru Kenyatta as Ambassador to Belgium, Luxembourg and the European Union on 27 January 2018. She previously served as the Cabinet Secretary for East African Affairs and Labor, immediately prior to her present assignment.

Background and education
Phyllis Kandie was born in Eldama Ravine, Baringo County, in 1965. She has a Bachelor of Commerce degree, majoring in Economics as a major, obtained from Saint Mary’s University, in Halifax, Nova Scotia in Canada. She then undertook postgraduate studies at Middlesex University and Durham University, in the United Kingdom, graduating with a Master of Business Administration (MBA) degree.

Career before politics
Phyllis Kandie served as the Director of investment advisory services at Standard Investment Bank, prior to her appointment to cabinet. She also served as a regulator within the Capital Markets, energy and agricultural sectors. She also served as a consultant for the World Bank and the European Union, regarding the SME sector.

Career as cabinet secretary
Phyllis Kandie served as the Cabinet Secretary for East African Affairs and Labour from 25 April 2013 until 27 January 2018.

Diplomatic career
When Phyllis Kandie, was dropped from cabinet in January 2018, she was appointed as Kenya's ambassador to Belgium, Luxembourg and the European Union.

Family
Phyllis Kandie is married to Ambassador Julius Kandie, a Kenyan diplomat and former Solicitor General. She is the mother of two sons, Lawrence and Simon.

Other considerations
She served on served boards of directors, including on the board of Kenya Revenue Authority. She is a member of the Institute of Directors of Kenya and of Kenya Private Sector Alliance (KEPSA), and of the Association of Stockbroker’s and Investment Banks.

See also
 Cabinet of Kenya
 Ministry of Foreign Affairs (Kenya)
 List of Durham University people

References

External links
Profile of Phyllis Jepkosgei Kipkingor Kandie

Living people
1965 births
Government ministers of Kenya
People from Baringo County
Kenyan women diplomats
Ambassadors of Kenya
Saint Mary's University (Halifax) alumni
Alumni of Middlesex University
Alumni of Durham University
Women ambassadors